Foxhall may refer to:

 Foxhall, County Donegal, Ireland
 Foxhall (horse) (1878-1904), an American-bred thoroughbred racehorse and sire
 Foxhall, Pembrokeshire, Wales
 Foxhall, Suffolk, a civil parish in the Suffolk Coastal district of Suffolk, England, UK
 Foxhall (Washington, D.C.), a neighborhood of Washington, D.C., U.S.
 Lin Foxhall (born 1961), British archaeologist
 Foxhall Stadium British motor racing stadium

See also
 Fox Hall, West Virginia
 Fox Hall (Westmore, Vermont), a historic house